Charles Yeo Yao Hui is a Singaporean lawyer and former politician who served as the chairman of the opposition Reform Party between 2020 and 2022.

Education
Yeo attended Bukit View Primary School, Victoria School and Anglo-Chinese School (Independent) before graduating from the University of Warwick, where he read law.

Career

Politics 
Yeo became a member of the Reform Party (RP) since 2011. Since June 2019, Yeo has been on the central executive committee of Reform Party (RP). On 5 August 2020, he was appointed to be chairman of RP.

2020 General Election
Yeo was part of the five-member Reform Party team which contested the Ang Mo Kio Group Representation Constituency during the 2020 Singaporean general election, running against the People's Action Party team which led by Prime Minister Lee Hsien Loong, and his team was defeated, with 28.09 percent of the votes.

Constituency broadcast and Internet meme
Yeo reached national prominence following the Reform Party's constituency broadcast for Ang Mo Kio GRC. Due to the absence of other team members, Yeo attempted to deliver his party's broadcast in Mandarin. His attempt became viral due to his non-fluency and amusing phraseology in Mandarin, something which sparked many internet memes and even drew comment from the Prime Minister's wife Ho Ching.

2021–present
Due to the arrest over alleged offences of criminal breach of trust and forgery in the course of his work, on 12 January 2022, Yeo had temporarily relinquish his chairmanship of the party since 15 January 2022. Separately on 19 January 2022, Yeo faced six charges, three counts under the Protection from Harassment Act for "harassing communication to a police officer and three counts for deliberately intending to wound religious feelings". On 1 August 2022, Yeo did not return to Singapore from a work related trip, breaching a bail condition, and was reported to be going to United Kingdom to seek political asylum.

Law 
Yeo was called to the bar in 2016, and works as a criminal defence lawyer. He was arrested on 12 January 2022 by the Singapore Police Force for alleged offences of criminal breach of trust and forgery. Yeo claimed that the arrest was conducted unprofessionally, and that the charges were "entirely trumped up and false", which the police categorically denied that the arrest was "politically motivated". The arrest was part of an investigation against Whitefield Law Corporation, where Yeo had been working at as a criminal defence lawyer. Four clients of the law firm had reported them, alleging criminal breach of trust and forgery. After the arrest, he appealed to the public to help with his legal bills, and had also launched a non-fungible token as a fundraising mechanism for the legal bills. Yeo subsequently worked at S K Kumar Law Practice.  While on bail in relation to the charges of criminal breach of trust, Yeo was granted travel to Vietnam between 27 July 2022 and 30 July 2022 for a work related matter. Yeo did not return back to Singapore and had not surrendered his passport to the investigation officer by 1 August 2022. Yeo also did not turn up to represent a client in trial on 1 August 2022. The Singapore police issued a gazette to arrest Yeo for breaching the conditions of his bail. The Singapore courts would later approve an arrest warrant requested by the prosecution on 2 August 2022.

References

1990 births
Living people
Victoria School, Singapore alumni
Anglo-Chinese School alumni
21st-century Singaporean lawyers
21st-century Singaporean politicians
Fugitives wanted by Singapore